Costa de Almería was a Spanish professional cycling team that existed from 2000 to 2004. The team was founded on the split of the Italian team . The team was sponsored by Jazztel and Paternina, and the tourist office of the Costa de Almería.

References

Cycling teams based in Spain
Defunct cycling teams based in Spain
2000 establishments in Spain
2004 disestablishments in Spain
Cycling teams established in 2000
Cycling teams disestablished in 2004